The Bruriah High School for Girls is a seven-year yeshiva school for girls located in Elizabeth, in Union County, New Jersey, United States, serving students in sixth through twelfth grades. Throughout the day the student curriculum consists of Judaic and secular studies. The school is part of the Jewish Educational Center, which is run by Dean Elazar Mayer Teitz. The current principal is Dr. Bethany Strulowitz, who joined the administrative team in 2021 and was promoted to principal at the end of the 2021-2022 school year. Bruriah, also known as BHS, offers a variety of athletic and academic teams, clubs, committees, APs, and other extracurricular activities. The Jewish Educational Center has been accredited by the Middle States Association of Colleges and Schools Commission on Elementary and Secondary Schools since 2008.

As of the 2019–20 school year, the school had an enrollment of 311 students and 76.3 classroom teachers (on an FTE basis), for a student–teacher ratio of 4.1:1. The school's student body was 99.4% (309) White, 0.3% (1) Black and 0.3% (1) Asian.

The school is named after the Talmudic figure Bruriah.

References

External links

1963 establishments in New Jersey
Education in Elizabeth, New Jersey
Educational institutions established in 1963
Jewish day schools in New Jersey
Modern Orthodox Judaism in New Jersey
Private high schools in Union County, New Jersey
Private middle schools in New Jersey
Orthodox yeshivas in New Jersey
Girls' schools in New Jersey